Nowland House is a historic home located at Newark Valley in Tioga County, New York, United States. The two story, cross gabled frame house was constructed about 1868 and exhibits characteristics of the Greek Revival and Italianate styles.  It is essentially "T" shaped in plan and features two porches. Also on the property are a garage and chicken house / feed shed.

It was listed on the National Register of Historic Places in 1997.

References

Houses on the National Register of Historic Places in New York (state)
Greek Revival houses in New York (state)
Houses in Tioga County, New York
National Register of Historic Places in Tioga County, New York